Driving licences in Hong Kong are issued by the  Transport Department. A full driving licence is valid for 10 years (unless the driver is approaching 70 years old in age) and is compulsory in order to drive a motor vehicle. Most driving licences are issued after the applicant passed a driving test for the respective type of vehicles. They may be issued without a test if the applicant is a holder of an overseas driving licence issued on passing a driving test in an approved country.

Format
In Hong Kong, a driving licence needs to be used along with another identity document, so it contains less information than in most other countries. The current version includes the holder's name, identity number (usually the same as the bearer's HKID number), driving entitlements and date of issue.  The Hong Kong Driving Licence does not have any photo.

Levels of licence
In Hong Kong, there are three levels of driving licences: learner's licence, provisional licence and full licence.

Learner's licence 
A new driver can start to learn to drive only a private car (class 1), light goods vehicle (class 2), motorcycle (class 3) or motor tricycle (class 22), while most other classes are considered commercial vehicles and require a driver to have certain experience to learn them.

A person can apply for a learner's licence even before passing the written test (with the exception of motorcycle and motor tricycle).

A driver with a learner's licence may drive on any public road, except roads not permitted for learners, motorways and tunnels, under the following conditions:
 carrying an L-plate at the front and back of the vehicle
 in specified times
 with the supervision of a qualified driving instructor (except motorcycle or motor tricycle)
 carrying no other passenger other than the driving instructor, test examiners and one other learner

A learner's licence is valid for 1 year and can be renewed.

In order to apply for a motorcycle / motor tricycle learner's licence, the driver has to first attend a compulsory course in a driving school and pass the compulsory test, after then, he/she can apply for the learner's licence and learn driving on streets. Unlike other classes of vehicles, no driving instructor is necessary when learning driving a motorcycle / motor tricycle.

Probationary licence 
After 1 October 2000, any person who applies to take a motorcycle or motor tricycle driving test is required to apply for a probationary driving licence upon passing the test. This scheme was extended to private cars and light goods vehicles in 2009. The holder of a probationary driving licence needs to undergo a 12-month probationary period. The probationary period will be extended by 6 months if convicted of a minor road traffic offence, and the licence will be cancelled if convicted of a serious road traffic offence.

A driver with a probationary licence may drive on any public road under the following conditions:
 carrying a P-plate at the front and back of the vehicle
 limited to 70 km/h, even if the speed limit of the road is greater
 cannot use the right lane on a motorway with 3 lanes or more, except when exiting on the right
 cannot carry a passenger on a motorcycle.

Light goods vehicles driver are exempt from this scheme and can apply for a full licence after passing the test if he/she is considered an "experienced driver", i.e. have already held the full private car driving licence for 3 years, or 2 years after converting from a probationary licence, immediately before the application.

A probationary licence is valid for 1 year when first applied, and can be renewed by half a year if the probationary period is not yet over for a certain class of vehicle.

Full licence 
After finishing the probationary period, the driver may apply for a full licence, valid for 10 years unless approaching 70 years old in age. For commercial vehicles, the driver may apply for a full licence after passing the test.

Vehicle Classification Code

Disused codes 
 8 Goods vehicle (with weight exceeding 2.25 tonnes)
 In the past, class 2 was vans with weight not exceeding 2.25 tones, and issuing class 1 (private car) licence could also automatically issue class 2
 Now replaced by classes 18, 19 and 20
 12 public bus (double decker and Guy Arab bus)
 13 public bus (double decker and Seddon midibus)
 Classes 12 and 13 are both replaced by class 17
 14 motor-assisted pedal cycle
 Hong Kong no longer licenses moped to drive on public roads.

Direct issue of a driving licence
As stated on the application form for direct issue of full Hong Kong driving licence, when a person has documentary evidence to the Commissioner's satisfaction that all of the following apply, the person is eligible to direct issue of a Hong Kong licence:
 One has a full driving licence (but not an International driving permit) during the past three years issued by one of the following countries or territories: Australia, Austria, Bangladesh, Belgium, Bermuda, Canada, China,  Denmark, Finland, France, Germany, Guernsey, India, Iceland, Ireland, the Isle of Man, Israel, Italy, Japan, Jersey, Luxembourg, Macao, Malaysia, the Netherlands, New Zealand, Nigeria, Norway, Pakistan, Portugal, Singapore, South Korea, Spain, Sweden, Switzerland, South Africa, Namibia, Taiwan, the United Kingdom and the United States
 The driving entitlement(s) for which one is applying must be equivalent to the class(es) which are authorized to drive by the issuing country or place; and
 Limited to private car, light goods vehicle, motor cycle and motor tricycle only. Other classes of driving license cannot be converted directly.
 The driving licence was obtained by passing the relevant driving test(s) in the issuing country or place; and
 Satisfies one of the three requirements below:
 The licence was originally issued on any date during a period of residence of not less than 6 months in the country or place of issue (entry and departure stamps on a passport, school transcript or employer's testimonial with employment period specified are accepted as proof); or
 The licence has been issued for not less than 5 years immediately before the application; or
 Hold a passport or an equivalent travel document of the country or place in which the licence was issued.

References
 

Road transport in Hong Kong
Law of Hong Kong
Hong Kong